The Battle of Kuryłówka, fought between the Polish anti-communist resistance organization, National Military Alliance (NZW) and the Soviet Union's NKVD units, took place on May 7, 1945, in the village of Kuryłówka, southeastern Poland. The battle ended in a victory for the underground Polish forces.

Background
In May 1945 World War II ended in Europe. But as Norman Davies wrote in No Simple Victory, even after Victory Day the war was not completely over: "In all Soviet-occupied countries the NKVD was hunting down a variety of political opponents and freedom fighters (...) Stalin and Stalinism were still in place - unregenerate, as murderous as ever, and victorious".

On May 7, a major battle between the Polish anti-communist resistance organization, National Military Alliance (Narodowe Zjednoczenie Wojskowe, NZW) and NKVD units took place in the village of Kuryłówka, located near Leżajsk (Subcarpathian Voivodeship). According to several sources, this was the biggest battle in the history of the Polish anti-communist movement, in which reportedly up to 70 NKVD agents died. Polish units were commanded by Major Franciszek Przysiężniak (noms de guerre "Marek", "Ojciec Jan").

1944-1945 in the area of Rzeszów
Most of the area of today's Subcarpathian Voivodeship was captured by the Red Army in the summer of 1944. The Soviets immediately started to persecute members of the Home Army, loyal to the Polish government-in-exile, and their actions sparked resistance (see: Łukasz Ciepliński, Adam Lazarowicz). On January 19, 1945, General Leopold Okulicki formally disbanded the Home Army, however several members of the organization decided to continue struggle for free Poland, seeing the Soviet forces as new occupiers. New movements were created, such as Wolność i Niezawisłość, Narodowe Siły Zbrojne, NIE or Narodowe Zjednoczenie Wojskowe.

These organizations were oppressed mainly by the NKVD and later by the newly created Polish secret police, Urząd Bezpieczeństwa. In the area of Rzeszów, the most important and the strongest of anti-Communist movements was Wolnosc i Niezawislosc, but other organizations such as Narodowe Zjednoczenie Wojskowe also were present. Rzeszów's district of NZW was run by several people including Kazimierz Mirecki, Józef Salabun, Kazimierz Nizieński, and Piotr Woźniak.

In March 1945, Rzeszów's NZW created the so-called Command of the Forest Units, which oversaw partisan troops in the area. These units were commanded by Major Franciszek Przysiężniak.

Battle
In early May, an NZW unit numbering some 200 soldiers was stationed in the village of Kuryłówka, near the town of Leżajsk. It was commanded by Major Przysiężniak. NKVD troops, stationed in Biłgoraj, found out about the Poles and sent two companies there, which probably were part of the 2nd Border Regiment of the NKVD (establishing Soviet sources on this matter is very difficult).

According to other sources, the NKVD troops came to Kuryłówka searching for a group of deserters from Polish People's Army (Ludowe Wojsko Polskie) who had decided to join the anti-Communist forces.

The battle took place on May 7. The Polish unit numbered some 200 soldiers; the exact number of NKVD troops is unknown, but most probably there were up to 300 of them. The skirmish ended in the NKVD unit's retreat. It is difficult to establish the number of NKVD victims; some sources claim that 56 agents died, some say up to 70. The number of Polish victims is unknown.

The next day
After the battle, the Polish unit, fearing reprisals, left the area of Kuryłówka. The next day, a strong NKVD force appeared in the village. The village of Kuryłówka was burned, more than 200 houses were razed to the ground. The Soviets then shot six persons, and two more died in the blaze. 920 people became homeless.

Aftermath
The Battle of Kuryłówka is commemorated on the Tomb of the Unknown Soldier, Warsaw, with the inscription “KURYŁÓWKA 7 V 1945"

See also
Cursed soldiers
Raid on Kielce Prison

References
  Wystawa „Żołnierze wyklęci. Antykomunistyczne podziemie na Rzeszowszczyźnie po 1944 roku” – Rzeszów, 1 marca 2001 r.
  Description of the Kuryłówka village, mentioning the battle
 Dionizy Garbacz "Zolnierze Wolyniaka", Stalowa Wola 1999,
 Dariusz Iwaneczko, Zbigniew Nawrocki "Rok pierwszy. Powstanie i dzialanosc aparatu Bezpieczenstwa Publicznego na Rzeszowszczyznie (sierpien 1944 – lipiec 1945)", Rzeszów 2005.
 Norman Davies, "No Simple Victory", Viking Penguin 2006.

Anti-communism in Poland
Kurylowka
Kurylowka
Conflicts in 1945
1945 in Poland
Battle of 
NKVD
Soviet World War II crimes in Poland
May 1945 events